Dominic Pürcher (born 24 June 1988 in Schladming) is an Austrian footballer who plays for SC Austria Lustenau.

External links

1988 births
Living people
Austrian footballers
SK Sturm Graz players
SV Grödig players
TSV Hartberg players
Kapfenberger SV players
SC Austria Lustenau players
Austria under-21 international footballers
Association football defenders